Eminoni Ranacou is a Fijian politician. He is a former member of the Senate of Fiji and represented Tailevu.

References

External links
Parliament of Fiji Islands website 

I-Taukei Fijian members of the Senate (Fiji)
Living people
Year of birth missing (living people)
Place of birth missing (living people)
Politicians from Tailevu Province